Nils-Joel Englund (7 April 1907 – 22 June 1995) was a Swedish cross-country skier who competed in the 1930s. He won a bronze medal in 50 km at the 1936 Winter Olympics in Garmisch-Partenkirchen.

Englund also won six medals at the Nordic skiing World Championships, earning three golds (4 × 10 km relay and 18 km: 1933, 50 km: 1935), one silver (50 km: 1934), and two bronzes (4 × 10 km relay: 1934, 1935). After retiring from competitions he coached the Swiss national skiing team for two years. Then he worked at the Sundin ski factory and ran a sports store in Hudiksvall.

Cross-country skiing results
All results are sourced from the International Ski Federation (FIS).

Olympic Games
 1 medal – (1 bronze)

World Championships
 6 medals – (3 gold, 1 silver, 2 bronze)

References

External links 

 

1907 births
1995 deaths
People from Boden Municipality
Cross-country skiers from Norrbotten County
Swedish male cross-country skiers
Cross-country skiers at the 1936 Winter Olympics
Olympic medalists in cross-country skiing
FIS Nordic World Ski Championships medalists in cross-country skiing
Medalists at the 1936 Winter Olympics
Olympic bronze medalists for Sweden